This is a list of Danish television related events from 1982.

Events
13 March - Brixx are selected to represent Denmark at the 1982 Eurovision Song Contest with their song "Video, Video". They are selected to be the fifteenth Danish Eurovision entry during Dansk Melodi Grand Prix held at the DR Studios in Copenhagen.

Ending this year
Matador

Births
26 January - Christiane Schaumburg-Müller, actress & TV host
2 March - Pilou Asbæk, actor
26 July - Saseline Sørensen, Malaysian-born singer-songwriter, model & TV host

Deaths

See also
1982 in Denmark